Christine Bjerendal (born 3 February 1987 in Lindome, Sweden) is a Swedish archer. She competed in the individual event at the 2012 Summer Olympics, 2016 Summer Olympics and 2020 Summer Olympics.  Her father Göran Bjerendal and uncle Gert Bjerendal were also Olympic archers.

References

External links
 

Swedish female archers
1987 births
Living people
Archers at the 2012 Summer Olympics
Archers at the 2016 Summer Olympics
Archers at the 2020 Summer Olympics
Olympic archers of Sweden
Archers at the 2019 European Games
European Games competitors for Sweden
Competitors at the 2009 World Games
21st-century Swedish women